Robert David Rothstein (April 20, 1948, Manhattan, New York, United States), better known as Rob Stoner, is an American multi-instrumental musician.

Early life
His father, Arthur Rothstein, (July 17, 1915 in New York City – November 11, 1985 in New Rochelle, New York) was an American photographer.

Career
Stoner started his career backing up various artists in New York City. His work can be heard on Don McLean's song "American Pie".

In 1973 he began a solo career that would eventually land him a contract with Epic Records in Nashville and later with MCA Records who released the solo album, Patriotic Duty, in 1980  Stoner also recorded an album of his original songs for Sun Records in the early 1980s.

In the summer of 1975 he was hired as bandleader, opening act and bass player in Bob Dylan's band. He played with Dylan during the Rolling Thunder Revue tour and on the Far East leg of Dylan's 1978 World Tour.  Stoner's singing and playing is featured on many Bob Dylan recordings, and he appeared in Dylan's 1978 movie, Renaldo & Clara.

After quitting touring life with Dylan, he resumed his solo career. He has played with such diverse artists as Chris Spedding, Link Wray, Robert Gordon, Chuck Berry, and Joni Mitchell.

Solo discography
1980 – Patriotic Duty – MCA Records – (MCA-5118)
1983 – If You Want It Enough – Sun Records – (Sun 1031)

References

External links

1948 births
Living people
American rock bass guitarists
American male bass guitarists
20th-century American bass guitarists
20th-century American male musicians